Sandra Piršić (born October 11, 1984) is a Slovenian female basketball player.

External links
Profile at eurobasket.com

1984 births
Living people
Sportspeople from Kranj
Slovenian women's basketball players
Slovenian expatriate basketball people in France
Slovenian expatriate basketball people in Spain
Centers (basketball)